William Wirt Kimball (January 9, 1848 – January 26, 1930) was a U.S. naval officer and an early pioneer in the development of submarines.

Biography
Kimball was born in Paris, Maine. In 1869 he graduated from the United States Naval Academy in Annapolis.

After serving on early navy torpedo boats, Kimball designed machine guns and armored cars, and switched to the development of submarines in the 1890s.

He commanded the Atlantic torpedo-boat fleet in the Spanish–American War.

In May 1906, he served as the first commander of the battleship New Jersey. In 1908, Kimball became rear admiral, and commanded expeditionary forces to Nicaragua in 1909. In 1910, he retired from active duty.

He died in Washington, D.C., on January 26, 1930, at the age of 82.

References

External links
 
 

1848 births
1930 deaths
People from Paris, Maine
United States Naval Academy alumni
United States Navy admirals
American military personnel of the Spanish–American War